The 2009 UMass Minutemen football team represented the University of Massachusetts Amherst in the 2009 NCAA Division I FCS football season as a member of the Colonial Athletic Association. The team was coached by Kevin Morris and played its home games at Warren McGuirk Alumni Stadium in Hadley, Massachusetts.  The 2009 season was Morris's first as head coach of the Minutemen, as Don Brown left the position in the offseason to become the defensive coordinator at Maryland. It was also the first year UMass finished with a losing record since joining the CAA, both overall (5–6) and in-conference (3–5).

Schedule

References

UMass
UMass Minutemen football seasons
UMass Minutemen football